Aagraham is a 1984 Indian Malayalam-language film, directed by Rajasenan and produced by V. Rajan. The film stars Menaka, Devan, Adoor Bhasi and Shubha in the lead roles. The film has musical score by A. T. Ummer.

Cast
Menaka
Devan
Adoor Bhasi
Shubha
Kanakalatha
Kuthiravattam Pappu
Lalu Alex
M. G. Soman
Ragini
T. G. Ravi

Soundtrack
The music was composed by A. T. Ummer and the lyrics were written by Poovachal Khader.

References

External links
 

1984 films
1980s Malayalam-language films
Films directed by Rajasenan